Terek-Suu is a village in Kara-Kulja District of Osh Region of Kyrgyzstan. Its population was 477 in 2021. It is situated on the river Tar.

References

Populated places in Osh Region